Antonio Henares Sierra (born 21 November 1956) is a wheelchair basketball athlete from Spain.  He has a physical disability: he is 4 point wheelchair basketball player. He played wheelchair basketball at the 1996 Summer Paralympics. His team was fourth after being defeated by the United States 66–60 in the bronze medal game.

References

External links 
 
 

1956 births
Living people
Spanish men's wheelchair basketball players
Wheelchair category Paralympic competitors
Paralympic wheelchair basketball players of Spain
Wheelchair basketball players at the 1996 Summer Paralympics
Sportspeople from Málaga
20th-century Spanish people
21st-century Spanish people